The 2021–22 Summit League women's basketball season is scheduled to begin with practices in October 2021 followed by the 2021–22 NCAA Division I women's basketball season in November 2021. The conference is scheduled to begin in December 2021. This was the fifteenth season under the Summit League name and the 40th since the conference was established under its current charter as the Association of Mid-Continent Universities in 1982.

The Summit League tournament is scheduled for March 5–8, 2022 at the Denny Sanford Premier Center in Sioux Falls, South Dakota.

Offseason

Pre-season

Recruiting classes

Preseason watchlists
Below is a table of notable preseason watch lists.

Preseason polls

Summit League Coaches' Poll

Source:

Summit League Preseason All-Conference

Preseason All-Summit League First Team

Preseason All-Summit League Second Team

Midseason watchlists
Below is a table of notable midseason watch lists.

Final watchlists
Below is a table of notable year end watch lists.

Regular season
The schedule will be released in middle of June.

Records against other conferences
2021–22 records against non-conference foes as of (April 2, 2022):

Regular Season

Post Season

Record against ranked non-conference opponents
This is a list of games against ranked opponents only (rankings from the AP Poll):

Team rankings are reflective of AP poll when the game was played, not current or final ranking

† denotes game was played on neutral site

Conference schedule
This table summarizes the head-to-head results between teams in conference play.

Points scored

Through November 8, 2021

Rankings

Head coaches

Coaching changes

Coaches
Note: Stats shown are before the beginning of the season. Overall and Summit League records are from time at current school.

Notes:
  Kansas City joined to Summit League in Summer of 2020.
  Oral Roberts joined to Summit League in Summer of 2014.
 ♠ In 2020 earned the NCAA tournament berth but the NCAA tournament canceled due the COVID-19 pandemic.
 Overall and Summit League records, conference titles, etc. are from time at current school and are through the end the 2020–21 season.
 NCAA tournament appearances are from time at current school only.
 NCAA Final Fours and Championship include time at other schools

Post season

Summit League tournament

South Dakota won the conference tournament from March 5–8, 2022, at the Denny Sanford Premier Center, Sioux Falls, SD. The top eight teams from the conference regular season play at the tournament. Teams were seeded by conference record, with ties broken by record between the tied teams followed by record against the regular-season champion, after the NET rankings if necessary.  

Reference:

NCAA tournament

One team from the conference were selected to participate: South Dakota. South Dakota State selected one of the "first four out" team, will act as standbys in the event a school is forced to withdraw before the start of the tournament due to COVID-19 protocols. But that didn't happen, so they participated in 2022 WNIT.

National Invitation Tournament 
Two teams from the conference were selected to participate: South Dakota State & Kansas City.

Awards and honors

Players of the Week 
Throughout the conference regular season, the Summit League offices named one or two players of the week each Monday.

Summit League Awards 

The Summit League announced its end of season awards on March 3, 2022 ahead of the start of the Summit League tournament.

WNBA Draft 

The Summit League had one player selected in the WNBA Draft. Hannah Sjerven from South Dakota selected by Minnesota Lynx on the 3rd round 28th overall pick.

References